Professor Oritsejolomi Horatio Thomas (1917–1979), was a Nigerian medical pioneer specialising in facial reconstructive and plastic surgery. In this latter discipline he trained as an assistant to the wartime legend, Sir Archibald MacIndoe. Professor Thomas was educated at Methodist Boys' High School Lagos and Birmingham University England. He was a Nigerian academic and pioneer provost of the College of Medicine University of Lagos and the first Nigerian to be admitted to the Royal College of Surgeons of England. He was also the first head of the University's Teaching Hospital, LUTH.
He was a Senior Lecturer and surgeon at the University of Ibadan, at the institution's inception to 1962 before proceeding to Lagos. He was an editor of the West African Medical Journal and was a member of the Federal Electoral Commission in 1958. He was the chairman of the advisory committee for the establishment of the Midwestern Medical Centre (now University of Benin Teaching Hospital) in the middle of 1969.

References

http://medicalnigeria.net/press_release_bashorun_j_k_randle.htm

1917 births
1979 deaths
Academic staff of the University of Ibadan
Academic staff of the University of Lagos
Nigerian plastic surgeons
Methodist Boys' High School alumni
20th-century Nigerian medical doctors
Vice-Chancellors of the University of Ibadan
20th-century surgeons